Crackheads Gone Wild is a 2006 documentary produced by Jarrod Donoman about cocaine users in Atlanta.

Post release
In an interview with The Guardian newspaper, Smith said he knew some of the people he filmed over a period of years and watched them slowly deteriorate. 'Many of these people are highly intelligent. I have footage of a lady who has a master's degree in education and used to work on Capitol Hill. She got hooked on drugs and now she's homeless. The point of the movie is: do not even try crack or this is what it will reduce you to. You will not have any control over your life and you will live and die for the drug.'

Smith later produced a sequel, Scared Straight.

By June 2006, over 400,000 bootleg copies of "Crackheads Gone Wild" were estimated to have been sold, at least partly due to viewers considering the film to be a comedy.

See also 
 Crack epidemic

References

External links
Crackheads Gone Wild at NPR

American documentary films
Documentary films about drug addiction
Documentary films about African Americans
Cocaine in the United States
Films about cocaine
2006 films
2006 documentary films
Films shot in Atlanta
Documentary films about Georgia (U.S. state)
2000s American films
Films set in Atlanta